Virginia Peak is the highest mountain in the Pah Rah Range of Washoe County in Nevada, United States. It is the most topographically prominent peak in Washoe County and ranks thirty-sixth among the most topographically prominent peaks in Nevada. The peak is on public land administered by the Bureau of Land Management and thus has no access restrictions. A National Weather Service NEXRAD doppler weather radar station is located on the summit.

References 

Mountains of Nevada
Mountains of Washoe County, Nevada